Chaetolopha is a genus of moths in the family Geometridae. Most species are endemic to Australia. A number of species previously assigned to this genus, were reassigned to the new genus Parachaetolopha in 2002.

Species
 Chaetolopha decipiens (Butler, 1886)
 Chaetolopha emporias (Turner, 1904)
 Chaetolopha incurvata (Moore, 1888)
 Chaetolopha leucophragma (Meyrick, 1891)
 Chaetolopha niphosticha (Turner, 1907)
 Chaetolopha oxyntis (Meyrick, 1891)
 Chaetolopha pseudooxyntis Schmidt, 2002

References

External links
 Chaetolopha at Markku Savela's Lepidoptera and Some Other Life Forms
 Natural History Museum Lepidoptera genus database

Larentiinae
Moth genera